Earl Va'a (born 1 May 1972) is a former rugby union and rugby league footballer who played internationally for Samoa.

Background
Va'a was born in Wellington, New Zealand.

Rugby league
Va'a started his career playing rugby league for the Wainuiomata Lions in New Zealand and in 1994 and 1995 he represented the Wellington City Dukes in the Lion Red Cup. He was selected in  Samoa's squad for the 1995 Rugby League World Cup although he did not play any matches during the tournament. He toured New Zealand with Western Samoa in 1994. Va'a scored 395 points in the three years of the Lion Red Cup, playing for both Wellington and the Hutt Valley Dolphins.

Rugby union
After switching to rugby union he represented Samoa from 1996 until 1999 including the 1999 Rugby World Cup. He also played for Samoa at the 2003 Rugby World Cup. He has played rugby for Richmond, L'Aquila and Worcester. He is also the top point scorer for Samoa.

At 5'5 Earl Va'a is one of the shortest professional players in world rugby and was officially the shortest player at the 2003 Rugby World Cup.

He coached the Wellington Lions in the 2015 ITM Cup but resigned in 2016.

Sources
 Andrews, Malcolm (2006) The ABC of Rugby League Austn Broadcasting Corpn, Sydney

References

1972 births
Living people
Dual-code rugby internationals
Expatriate rugby union players in England
New Zealand expatriate rugby union players
New Zealand expatriate sportspeople in England
New Zealand sportspeople of Samoan descent
New Zealand rugby union coaches
People educated at St Bernard's College, Lower Hutt
Richmond F.C. players
Rugby league five-eighths
Rugby league fullbacks
Rugby union fly-halves
Samoa international rugby union players
Samoa national rugby league team players
Samoan rugby league players
Samoan rugby union players
Wainuiomata Lions players
Wellington rugby league team players
Worcester Warriors players